This is a list of equipment used in the Royal Navy.

Naval ships

Lists of active ships
 :Category:Naval ships of the United Kingdom
 List of active Royal Navy ships
 List of ships of Serco Marine Services

List of ships by name
 List of ship names of the Royal Navy
 List of ship names of the Royal Navy (A)
 List of ship names of the Royal Navy (B)
 List of ship names of the Royal Navy (C)
 List of ship names of the Royal Navy (D-F)
 List of ship names of the Royal Navy (G-H)
 List of ship names of the Royal Navy (I-L)
 List of ship names of the Royal Navy (M-N)
 List of ship names of the Royal Navy (O-Q)
 List of ship names of the Royal Navy (R-T)
 List of ship names of the Royal Navy (U-Z) 
 List of Royal Fleet Auxiliary ship names

Lists of ships by type
 List of aircraft carriers of the Royal Navy
 Aircraft maintenance carriers of the Royal Navy
 List of amphibious warfare ships of the Royal Navy
 List of amphibious warfare ships of the Royal Fleet Auxiliary
 List of battlecruisers of the Royal Navy
 List of pre-dreadnought battleships of the Royal Navy
 List of dreadnought battleships of the Royal Navy
 List of bomb vessels of the Royal Navy
 List of corvette and sloop classes of the Royal Navy
 List of cruiser classes of the Royal Navy
 List of destroyer classes of the Royal Navy
 List of early warships of the English Navy
 List of escort carriers of the Royal Navy
 List of fireships of the Royal Navy
 List of frigate classes of the Royal Navy
 Type system of the Royal Navy
 List of gunboat and gunvessel classes of the Royal Navy
 List of gun-brigs of the Royal Navy
 List of hospitals and hospital ships of the Royal Navy
 List of ironclads of the Royal Navy
 List of mine countermeasure vessels of the Royal Navy
 List of miscellaneous ships of the Royal Fleet Auxiliary
 List of monitors of the Royal Navy
 List of breastwork monitors of the Royal Navy
 List of patrol vessels of the Royal Navy
 List of replenishment ships of the Royal Fleet Auxiliary
 List of royal yachts of the United Kingdom
 List of seaplane carriers of the Royal Navy
 List of ships of the line of the Royal Navy
 List of submarines of the Royal Navy
 List of submarine classes of the Royal Navy
 List of support ships of the Royal Navy
 List of survey vessels of the Royal Navy
 List of torpedo boat classes of the Royal Navy
 Trawlers of the Royal Navy
 List of requisitioned trawlers of the Royal Navy (WWII)
 List of warships of the Scots Navy

Aircraft and helicopters
 List of aircraft of the Royal Naval Air Service
 List of aircraft of the Fleet Air Arm
 List of active United Kingdom military aircraft
 List of British airships

Anti-aircraft weapons and equipment
 Holman Projector – retired

Naval anti-aircraft guns
 30mm DS30M Mark 2 Automated Small Calibre Gun
 4.7 inch QF Mark IX & XII – retired
 Bofors 40mm gun – retired
 Oerlikon 20mm cannon 
 Ordnance QF 3-pounder Vickers – retired
 Phalanx CIWS
 QF 2-pounder naval gun – retired
 QF 3-inch 20 cwt – retired
 QF 4 inch Mk V naval gun – retired
 QF 4 inch Mk XVI naval gun – retired
 QF 4.5-inch Mk I - V naval gun – retired
 QF 4.7 inch Mk VIII naval gun – retired
 Vickers .50 machine gun – retired

Surface-to-air anti-aircraft missiles
 Fairey Stooge – retired
 Seacat – retired
 Sea Ceptor
 Sea Dart – retired
 Seaslug – retired
 Sea Viper
 Sea Wolf

Surface-to-air anti-aircraft rockets
 Unrotated projectile - retired

Anti-aircraft equipment
 Fuze Keeping Clock
 Gyro rate unit
 HACS
 Hazemeyer gun mount
 Pom-Pom director

Anti-submarine weapons and equipment

Anti-submarine missiles
 Ikara - retired

Anti-submarine mortars
 BL 7.5-inch naval howitzer - retired
 Fairlie Mortar – retired
 Hedgehog – retired
 Limbo – retired
 Squid – retired

Anti-submarine sonar and equipment
 List of British Asdic systems
 Sonar 2076
 Sonar 2087

Depth charges
 Mk 11 depth charge

Nuclear bombs 1950s-1990s
 WE.177 - retired
 Red Beard - retired

Homing torpedoes
 18" Mark 30 torpedo - retired
 Stingray
 Tigerfish - retired

Guided missiles

Air-to-air missiles
 AIM-7 Sparrow – retired
 AIM-9 Sidewinder
 ASRAAM
 AIM-120 AMRAAM
 Firestreak – retired
 Red Top – retired

Air-to-surface missiles
 AGM-12 Bullpup – retired
 Martlet
 SS.11 – retired
 SS.12/AS.12 – retired
 Sea Skua – retired
 Sea Eagle – retired
 Sea Venom

Land attack missiles
 Tomahawk

Anti-ship missiles
 Exocet – retired
 Harpoon
 Red Angel – retired

Submarine-launched ballistic missiles
 UGM-27 Polaris – Retired. See the ET.317 nuclear warhead, Chevaline and the Polaris (UK nuclear programme)
 Trident II D5 missile - See the Trident (UK nuclear programme)

Unmanned aerial vehicles
 Boeing Insitu ScanEagle
 Target Technology Ltd Imp

Target drones
 Airspeed Queen Wasp
 Curtiss Queen Seamew
 De Havilland DH.82 Queen Bee
 Northrop MQM-36 Shelduck
 Miles Queen Marinet
 Northrop BQM-74 Chukar

Mine disposal systems
 Paravane

Remotely operated underwater vehicles
 Seafox drone

Unguided rockets

Air-to-surface rockets
 RP-3
 SNEB

Naval artillery weapons and equipment

Naval guns
 4.5 inch Mark 8 naval gun

Naval artillery equipment
 Admiralty Fire Control Table - retired
 Vickers range clock - retired

Torpedoes
British 18 inch torpedo
British 21 inch torpedo
British 24.5 inch torpedo
Spearfish torpedo
Whitehead torpedo – retired

Naval radars
 see List of World War II British naval radar
 Type 965 radar
 Type 984 radar
 Type 997 Artisan radar
 Type 1022 Radar
 S1850M
 SAMPSON

Uniforms

 Royal Navy ranks, rates, and uniforms of the 18th and 19th centuries
 Uniforms of the Royal Navy

Royal Marines
 List of equipment of the Royal Marines
 List of active Royal Marines military watercraft
 Uniforms of the Royal Marines

Equipment by era 

 Category:World War II naval weapons of the United Kingdom
List of British naval forces military equipment of World War II
 
 List of Royal Navy military equipment of the Cold War

Other equipment

Corsham Computer Centre
NATO Submarine Rescue System
Submarine Command System

See also
Active Royal Navy weapon systems

Equipment
United Kingdom